The following is a list of the forced labor subcamps of the Nazi Buchenwald concentration camp.

See also
List of Nazi concentration camps

Notes and references

 
Buchenwald